Bart Adrianus Johannes Meijers (born 10 January 1997) is a Dutch professional footballer who plays as a centre-back for Liga I club Petrolul Ploiești.

Career
Meijers made his professional debut in the Eerste Divisie for NAC Breda on 24 February 2017 in a game against FC Volendam.

Honours
Petrolul Ploiești
Liga II: 2021–22

References

External links
 

Living people
1997 births
Footballers from Breda
Association football central defenders
Dutch footballers
NAC Breda players
Helmond Sport players
Almere City FC players
Eredivisie players
Eerste Divisie players
FC Petrolul Ploiești players
Liga I players
Liga II players
Dutch expatriate footballers
Dutch expatriate sportspeople in Romania
Expatriate footballers in Romania